The Draw River Forest Reserve is found in Ghana. It was established in 1937, and covers 235 km.

The Draw River flows through the eastern part of the reserve.

It is located at 75 meters above sea level.

References

Forest reserves of Ghana